The 1999 Bayern Rundfahrt was the 20th edition of the Bayern Rundfahrt cycle race and was held on 20 May to 24 May 1999. The race started in Scheinfeld and finished in Oberstdorf. The race was won by Rolf Aldag.

General classification

References

Bayern-Rundfahrt
1999 in German sport